Giuseppe "Pippo" Fava (15 September 1925 in Palazzolo Acreide – 5 January 1984 in Catania) was an Italian writer, investigative journalist, playwright, and Antimafia activist who was killed by the Mafia. He was the founder of the I Siciliani, a monthly magazine. His motto in life was "Is there any use in living if you don't have the courage to fight?"

Journalism
Born and raised in Palazzolo Acreide in the province of Siracusa in Sicily, Fava moved to Catania to study law. Graduating in 1947, he soon moved to journalism and became a professional journalist in 1952. He became the editor-in-chief of the Espresso Sera daily newspaper in Catania—the main city on Sicily's east coast—and in 1980, he assumed the same position at Il Giornale del Sud, where he formed a team of young journalists that turned the paper into an independent, investigative journal. At the time, not much was known about the owners, but it became clear that some of them had connections with the Mafia. Fava was fired.

I Siciliani
In 1983, Fava and his team of independent journalists founded the progressive monthly magazine I Siciliani ("The Sicilians"). The magazine denounced the connections between Mafia, politics, and business in Catania. Fava also became part of the movement against the deployment of Ground-Launched Cruise Missiles (GLCM) by NATO at Comiso airport in June 1983.

However, it was the investigations into the Cosa Nostra and its tentacles in politics and business—in particular those of Sicily's biggest Catania-based construction firms, owned by the four famous Cavalieri del Lavoro, Carmelo Costanzo, Francesco Finocchiaro, Mario Rendo, and Gaetano Graci (one of the owners of the newspaper that had sacked Fava)—that would determine Fava's fate. Graci went on regular hunting parties with Nitto Santapaola, the undisputed Mafia boss of Catania, who was on the payroll of Costanzo as well. In the first edition of I Siciliani, Fava published the article "I quattro cavalieri dell'apocalisse mafiosa" ("The four horsemen of the Mafia apocalypse"), exposing the corruption and political influence peddling by the four mob bosses that tied together the local Mafia, high finance, and political figures.

Death and aftermath
On 5 January 1984, Fava was killed while he was waiting to pick up his granddaughter, who was rehearsing a part in a theatre comedy. The week before, he had been a guest on Enzo Biagi's national TV show on Rete 4, where he denounced the sway the Mafia held in parliament.

In 1994, Maurizio Avola, a nephew of Santapaola, confessed to killing Fava, and became a pentito. He also confessed to some seventy other murders. Avola said that his uncle Nitto Santapaola had ordered the killing of the journalist, as a favour to the cavalieri. In 1998, Santapaola and Aldo Ercolano were convicted for ordering the killing of Giuseppe Fava. In 2001, the Court of Appeal in Catania confirmed the life sentences of Santapaola and Ercolano and the actual killer, Maurizio Avola, but acquitted Marcello D'Agata, Vincenzo Santapaola, and Franco Giammuso, who had allegedly assisted in the murder. Avola was sentenced to six years and six months in prison. In 2003, the Supreme Court confirmed the sentences of Santapaola, Ercolano, and Avola.

Fava's son, Claudio, is a Member of the European Parliament for  Italy with the Democrats of the Left (DS).

The volumes Process to Sicily and The Sicilians of 1970 and 1978, respectively, collect Giuseppe Fava's most meaningful journalistic inquiries. Among his novels are Gente di rispetto (1975), Prima che vi uccidano (1977), and Passione di Michele (1980).

See also
 List of victims of the Sicilian Mafia
 List of journalists killed in Europe

References

External links

  I Siciliani online
  I Siciliani
  Dossier Pippo Fava
  , press reaction to Fava's murder, I Siciliani, April 1984
  Cinque Gennaio by Riccardo Orioles, Girodivite, 5 April 2006
  Giuseppe Fava Foundation
  Quello che mi e' rimasto di mio padre, by Claudio Fava, article on the occasion of the 25th memorial of the killing.

20th-century Italian journalists
20th-century Italian male writers
1925 births
1984 deaths
Antimafia
Assassinated Italian journalists
Assassinated activists
Historians of the Sicilian Mafia
Italian magazine editors
Italian magazine founders
Italian male journalists
People from Palazzolo Acreide
People murdered by the Sicilian Mafia